Logix Group is a real estate company headquartered in Noida, India.

The company was founded by Shakti Nath in 1997. The group has expanded rapidly. The group has been a developer of IT parks and IT Special Economic Zones. The company has created more than 25 such IT spaces, and has furnished 4 million square feet of IT property.

The group has joint ventures with various funds and foreign direct investment partners like ICICI Prudential; Taib Capital – ACACIA, Bahrain, and Citi Property Investors (taken over by Apollo Global Management).

References

External links 

 Logix Group
Click Here

Real estate companies of India
Real estate companies established in 1997
Companies based in Noida